The Last Address is a civic initiative to commemorate the victims of repressions in the Soviet Union. The essence of the initiative is that ordinary people deserve to be commemorated, not only "VIPs" which typically receive memorial plaques. A small commemorative plaque (palm-sized) is installed on the houses known as the last residential addresses of those arrested. Every commemorative plaque is dedicated to one person only, with the project operating according to the motto "One name, one life, one sign".

Description 

The project is the initiative of Moscow and St. Petersburg historians, civic and civil rights activists, journalists, architects, designers and writers.

The project initiative had originated with journalist and publisher Sergey Parkhomenko, who saw in Germany the stones of the European Stolpersteine project to commemorate the victims of Nazism.  Within the scope of that project, over 50,000 memorial stones were set up in Germany and other countries of Europe. The organizers of "Last Address" intend to install a comparable number of plaques across Russia.

The memorial sign is a stainless steel plaque  with the information on the repressed person: his or her name, profession, date of birth, date of arrest, date of death, date of exoneration. The design of the memorial plaques is by architect Alexander Brodsky. The hole in the plaque symbolizes the missing photo.

The project is based on the law “On the Rehabilitation of the Victims of Political Repressions” adopted in 1991. The law treats the period of political repressions in Russia and USSR as starting on 25 October (7 November) 1917. The official representative of the project is the nonprofit entity Last Address Foundation for the Commemoration of Victims of Political Repression founded by the Memorial Society and a number of individual persons through voluntary contributions from private citizens and organizations.

On 15 June 2018 "The last address" received a German Karl Wilhelm Fricke award. Its monetary part will be sent to the Ukrainian project "Ostannya Addresa", in order to avoid the status of a "foreign agent".

Installing memorial signs in Russia 
The first Russian cities to install memorial signs became Moscow and Saint Petersburg. On 7 February 2020, the thousandth memorial sign  was installed in Russia: in the city of Gorokhovets, Vladimir Oblast. By that moment the plaques were also installed in the following cities: Yekaterinburg, Rostov-on-Don, Perm, Taganrog, Barnaul, Krasnoyarsk, etc.

Presented below are some Russian cities where memorial plaques of "Last Address" have been installed.

In Moscow 
The first memorial signs of “Last Address” project were installed in Moscow on Human Rights Day, 10 December 2014. Some of the signs were made in response to applications of the residents of houses where repressed people had lived.

The next batch of signs was installed in February–March 2015. By January 2015, over 500 applications for the installation of memorial sign had been submitted. Since 2016, the installation of memorial signs is being performed usually 2 times per month.

In St. Petersburg 
The first 12 memorial signs on the houses of Saint Petersburg were installed on 21–22 March 2015; 80 more applications were submitted to St. Petersburg “Memorial” office. At the initiative of Anna Akhmatova Literary and Memorial Museum, two plaques were installed on the wall of the “Fountain House” commemorating the poet’s civil partner, art historian Nikolay Punin, and his daughter’s husband, worker Genrikh Kaminsky.

In two cases, the applicant was a resident of the house who decided to install plaques for all those for whom that house had been a last address. These are the houses at Pushkinskaya ulitsa 19 (three signs) and Fontanka Embankment 129 (five signs). The installation of the memorial sign at Ulitsa Rubinshteina 19 was attended by a relative of the repressed person who came from Kyiv specifically for that purpose. Sergey Parkhomenko says that the emotional reaction is easy to understand: “Last Address” is often the only place where the name of the deceased is commemorated, because most of those repressed were buried in mass graves.

The second batch of memorial signs installed on six houses on 25–26 July 2015 included such names as artist B. Malakhovsky, outstanding literary scholar G. Gukovsky, as well as scientists, engineers, and people who were not famous or outstanding in any way, such as the family Belenkiye-Bodganovy (an accountant and a housewife) arrested as “Polish spies.”

In Perm and Perm Krai 
“Last Address” was launched in Perm in February 2014. The first four plaques were installed on 10 August 2015.  The project founder Serguei Parkhomenko came from Moscow to Perm; in an interview to Zvezda magazine he talked about the ways to launch an initiative group, what the cases of the repressed were telling us and whether it was necessary or advisable to install signs commemorating the organizers of repressions.

The first village with a “Last Address” sign was the village Kupros of Yusvinsky District, Komi-Permyak Okrug. The memorial sign was installed on 11 August 2015 on the façade of the house that was the last residential address of peasant Valentin Startsev, declared by investigators “an active participant of the liquidated counterrevolutionary insurgent organization.” Investigators claimed that Startsev was “conducting counterrevolutionary defeatist agitation among kolkhoz members, trying to prove the inevitability of the fall of Soviet power,” “praising the old Tsarist regime and proving unprofitability of kolkhozes”; as a result, he was sentenced to capital punishment in the form of execution by a firing squad.

In Taganrog 
The first commemorative sign in Taganrog was installed on 31 May 2015. The ceremony was attended by project founder Serguei Parkhomenko, the deputy of Oblast Duma Oleg Kobyakov, president of the Council of the regional branch of the Russian National Society for the Preservation of Historical and Cultural Monuments Alexander Kozhin, residents of neighboring houses and numerous journalists.

Installing memorial signs in other countries 
The first country outside Russia became Ukraine, where a separate project "" based on Russian "Last address" started working. On 5 May 2017 the first three commemorative plaques were installed on three houses in Kyiv.

On 7 June 2017, on the day of political prisoners, signs of the Last address appeared on the facades of four houses in Prague.

On 2 August 2018, the Ultima adresa project was launched in Moldova: the first two plates of the “Last Address” appeared in Chișinău.

On 5 October 2018, the Georgian project "", "Last Address, Georgia" officially started.

On 30 August 2019, the first commemorative plaque appeared in Germany, in the Thuringian city of Treffurt.

References

External links 
 
 Website of the project (Russian)

 Publications in other languages
 
 
  
  
  

Types of monuments and memorials
Political repression in the Soviet Union
Monuments and memorials in Russia